The Tacoma station was a passenger rail station in Tacoma, Washington, owned by the Chicago, Milwaukee, St. Paul and Pacific Railroad (the "Milwaukee Road"). It opened in 1954 and closed in 1961. It was the Milwaukee Road's final station in Tacoma, replacing a station formerly owned by the Tacoma Eastern Railroad.

Design 
The building was designed by K. E. Hornung of Chicago. A noteworthy feature of the waiting room was a gold-toned mural of the Chicago skyline (the Milwaukee Road's headquarters were also in Chicago.) The masonry construction incorporated a Red Roman brick finish. The building's centerpiece was a  tower topped by a large stainless-steel sign bearing the name of the company. The waiting room itself featured full-height glass windows on two facings, overlooking the Milwaukee rail yards. The station cost the Milwaukee Road $150,000.

History 
The Milwaukee Road had used the Tacoma Eastern Railroad's former station since beginning service to Tacoma in 1909. That station was located at South 25th and A street, near the present location of the South 25th Street Tacoma Link station and Interstate 705. The first train to use the station was a westbound Columbian, which arrived from Chicago on April 20, 1954. The first train to depart was an eastbound Olympian Hiawatha. Service ended with the discontinuation of the Olympian Hiawatha on May 22, 1961.

See also 
Tacoma Union Station

References

External links 

Buildings and structures in Tacoma, Washington
Former Chicago, Milwaukee, St. Paul and Pacific Railroad stations in Washington (state)
Railway stations closed in 1961
Railway stations in the United States opened in 1954
1954 establishments in Washington (state)
1961 disestablishments in Washington (state)
Transportation in Tacoma, Washington